A suppository is a dosage form used to deliver medications by insertion into a body orifice where it dissolves or melts to exert local or systemic effects. There are three types of suppositories, each to insert into a different sections: rectal suppositories into the rectum, vaginal suppositories into the vagina, and urethral suppositories into the urethra of a male.

Suppositories are ideal for infants, elderly individuals and post-operative patients, who are unable to swallow oral medications, and for individuals experiencing severe nausea and/or vomiting.

Composition
Several different ingredients can be used to form the base of a suppository: cocoa butter or a similar substitute, polyethylene glycol, hydrogels, and glycerinated gelatin. The type of material used depends on the type of suppository, the type of drug, and the conditions in which the suppository will be stored.

Rectal suppositories

In 1991, a study on suppository insertion in The Lancet found that the "torpedo" shape helps the device to travel internally, increasing its efficacy. The findings of this single study have been challenged as there is insufficient evidence on which to base clinical practice. Rectal suppositories are intended for localized or systemic action to relieve pain, constipation, irritation, inflammation, nausea and vomiting, fever, migraines, allergies, and sedation.

Urethral suppositories
Alprostadil pellets are urethral suppositories used for the treatment of severe erectile dysfunction (impotence). They are marketed under the name Muse in the United States. Its use has diminished since the development of oral impotence medications.

See also 

 Artesunate suppositories
 Enema
 Pessary

Notes

References

 Doyle, D., "Per Rectum: A History of Enemata", Journal of the Royal College of Physicians of Edinburgh, Vol.35, No.4, (December 2005), pp. 367–370.
 Payer, L., "Borderline Cases: How Medical Practice Reflects National Culture", The Sciences, Vol.30, No.4, (July–August 1990), pp. 38–42.

Anus
Constipation
Dosage forms
Drug delivery devices
Drugs acting on the gastrointestinal system and metabolism
Laxatives
Rectum
Routes of administration